Big Mama's & Papa's Pizzeria is a pizza restaurant chain primarily located in Southern California. The chain is notable for its extremely large "Giant Sicilian" pizza, which is claimed to be the largest deliverable pizza in the world. Additionally, the chain gained notoriety when, during the 86th Academy Awards in 2014, host Ellen DeGeneres had Big Mama's pizzas delivered onstage.

The first Big Mama's & Papa's was opened in 1992 by Armenian immigrant brothers Aro and Allen Agakhanyan. At the time, the brothers were neither fluent in English nor out of high school. Since that time, the chain has expanded to 20 restaurants in the Southern California region, with both company-owned and franchise operations. In 2015, Big Mama's announced that it will be expanding internationally to Dubai.

Fare
One of the restaurant's signature products is a very large "Giant Sicilian" pizza. The pizza measures 54" by 54" and has approximately 200 slices. It holds the record of "largest pizza commercially available." Big Mama's small delivery vehicles have special compartments attached to the roof to accommodate the size of this pizza.

Philanthropy
In 1993, deeply affected by the 1992 Los Angeles riots, the Agakhanyan brothers held a monthlong campaign called "Intolerance Down, Pepperoni Up!" with 5% of all profits donated to the USC Center for Black Cultural and Student Affairs (CBCSA).

In popular culture
During the 86th Academy Awards in 2014, host Ellen DeGeneres called for pizzas to be delivered for the enjoyment of the audience (composed of numerous celebrities). DeGeneres often frequents Big Mama's, which has a location near her studio. An order was made for twenty pizzas to be delivered to the Dolby Theatre. To the surprise of the deliveryman (who thought the pizza was merely for the backstage crew), Ellen brought him onstage and had him deliver the pizza to the assembled celebrities. She then passed Pharrell's trademark hat around to gather contributions for a tip from the movie stars. Given the huge audience of the award ceremony, the going price of advertisement time, and the fact that the bit lasted approximately 3 minutes, Big Mama's received approximately $10 million in free publicity.

See also

 List of pizza chains of the United States

References

External links
 

1992 establishments in California
Pizza chains of the United States
Restaurants established in 1992
Restaurants in California